William North (1755January 3, 1836) was an American soldier and politician.

Early life
William North was born in Pemaquid, Maine, to John North and Elizabeth Pitson in 1755. John was an Irish immigrant and Elizabeth a native of Boston. He had two half-siblings from his father's previous marriage to Elizabeth Lewis, Joseph and Mary North.

His father, Captain John North, was Lieutenant Commander of Fort Frederick between 1744 and 1756, and in charge of Fort St. George from 1756 to 1763. He was also appointed Judge of the Court of Common Pleas for the county in 1760.

After the death of his father in 1763, North moved with his mother to Boston, Massachusetts. There he attended the Boston Latin School between 1764 and 1770. While in Boston, North worked in a Merchant's office, where he remained until the port was closed by the British in the fall of 1774.

Career

Military career
He entered the Continental Army in 1775 and served under Benedict Arnold in the unfortunate expedition to Canada in that year. Though he volunteered, he was apparently too sick to participate. On May 9, 1776, he was commissioned second lieutenant in Captain John Gill's company of Colonel Thomas Craft's regiment of train artillery. He was then appointed in May 1777 as captain in Colonel Henry Jackson's 16th Massachusetts Regiment, with which he participated in the Battle of Monmouth. According to his son, the commission "went with my father in his bosom through the War of the Revolution".

In 1778 he met Baron Steuben, and the following year was appointed his aide-de-camp, and greatly assisted him introducing his system of discipline in the Continental Army. Later he accompanied Steuben to Virginia, and was present at the surrender of Cornwallis and the siege of Yorktown. Based on the Baron's recommendation, North was appointed as Inspector of the Troops under General Henry Knox in 1784.

North was appointed by Act of Congress a Major in the 2d United States Regiment on October 20, 1786. This regiment was added to the army temporarily in response to Daniel Shays' uprising of debtor farmers in Massachusetts.

After the war he settled in Duanesburg, New York, where he married.

He was appointed adjutant general of the United States Army with the rank of brigadier general on July 19, 1798. In March of 1799, after eight months of inactive duty, Congress added the role of assistant inspector general to the position. As inspector general, Alexander Hamilton, who had worked closely with North during the Revolutionary War, subsequently requested him to serve as his chief of staff. There he assisted in Hamilton's attempt at reforming and strengthening the army. North began a revision of the army's general regulations in the winter of 1799–1800 before Congress abolished his and other staff appointments as tensions with France diminished in May. He was discharged in June.

In March 1812, he was again appointed adjutant-general of the Army, but declined. He may have declined due to his party's opposition to the war, which was especially strong in his home state of New York.

George Washington included North "among the most intelligent and active Officers of the late American Army" in a letter suggesting men for military appointment.

Caesar Russell, an African American Private in the 4th Massachusetts Regiment, served as North's personal servant while aide-de-camp to Baron Steuben.

Relationship with Baron Steuben
North and a fellow aide-de-camp, Captain Benjamin Walker, were formally adopted by Steuben and made his heirs. Some historians believe that these 'extraordinary intense emotional relationships' were romantic, and given Steuben's reported earlier behaviour, it has been suggested it would have been out-of-character for him if they were not. However, based on the limited historical record, it is impossible to prove.  Following Baron Steuben's death,  North divided the property bequeathed to him among his military companions.

North named two of his six children after the Baron, Frederic William Steuben North and William Augustus Steuben North.

Political office
He was a member of the New York State Assembly from Albany County in 1792, 1794 and 1795, from Albany and Schenectady Counties in 1796, and from Schenectady County in 1810. He was Speaker in 1795, 1796 and 1810. North was appointed as a Federalist to the United States Senate to fill the vacancy caused by the resignation of John Sloss Hobart and served from May 5, 1798, to August 17, 1798, when James Watson was elected and qualified to succeed.

As a strong Federalist, North supported the Aliens and Sedition Acts and other efforts against the Democratic-Republican opposition. Additionally, he supported the establishment of a Provisional army, following the outbreak of the Quasi-war with France.

He was a member of the first Erie Canal Commission, from 1810 to 1816.

North was a commissioner and director of the Great Western Turnpike Company which was established by the New York state legislature March 15, 1799. It was commissioned to build a road from Albany to Cherry Valley.

Personal life

On October 14, 1787, North married Mary Duane (b. 1762), the daughter of James Duane (1733–1797), the 44th Mayor of New York City and U.S. District Judge for the District of New York, appointed by George Washington. Together, they had six children, Frederic William Steuben (1788–1789), Marie (1780–1812), James Duane (1791–1792), Elizabeth (1792–1845), William Augustus Steuben (1793–1845), Adelia (1797–1878).

It has been suggested that North and Benjamin Walker held a romantic relationship, but like with the Baron, this is difficult to be certain of. Nevertheless, and despite a falling out between 1811 and 1813, Walker remained North's most intimate friend until their deaths. Walker was named as a sponsor of North's daughter Adelia at her baptism.

The General William North House was listed on the National Register of Historic Places in 1987.

General North was an original member of the Society of the Cincinnati. He died in New York City, and was buried in the crypt under the Christ Episcopal Church in Duanesburg.

References

External links

The New York Civil List compiled by Franklin Benjamin Hough (pages 40 and 294; Weed, Parsons and Co., 1858)
Political Graveyard 
William North Historic Marker

 The Society of the Cincinnati

 The American Revolution Institute

1755 births
1836 deaths
Continental Army officers from Massachusetts
Adjutants general of the United States Army
Erie Canal Commissioners
Inspectors General of the United States Army
People from Bristol, Maine
Speakers of the New York State Assembly
United States Army generals
United States senators from New York (state)
New York (state) Federalists
Federalist Party United States senators
People from Duanesburg, New York
Duane family